Sowden is an English-language surname. Notable people with this name include:
 Arthur Sowden (1878–1954), Australian rules footballer. 
 Billy Sowden (1930–2010), English (soccer) footballer
 Des Sowden (born 1974), English professional boxer
 George Sowden (born 1942), English designer and product developer in Milan, Italy
 Paddy Sowden, Peter Tasker Sowden (1929–2010), English (soccer) footballer
 Robin Sowden-Taylor (born 1982), Welsh international rugby player
 William Henry Sowden (1840–1907), U.S. Representative from Pennsylvania
 William John Sowden (1858–1943), South Australian journalist

See also
Snowden (surname)